Tom H. Greene (born August 2, 1932) is a politician and lawyer in the American state of Florida. He served in the Florida House of Representatives from 1963 to 1966, representing Duval County. He also briefly served in the State Senate, from 1966 to 1967.

References

1932 births
Living people
Democratic Party members of the Florida House of Representatives
20th-century American politicians